Pixieland may refer to:

Pixieland (Dartmoor), a visitor attraction in Dartmoor National Park
Pixieland (Oregon), United States, a theme park that operated between 1969 and 1974
"Pixieland", a song by Shorty Rogers on the 1957 album Way Up There
Pixieland Productions, a music production company owned by Camilla Gottschalck and Christina Schilling
Brocklands Adventure Park, a former leisure park in Cornwall, United Kingdom known as Pixieland Fun Park between 1997 and 2000